Aboriginal Gallery of Dreamings (AGOD) is an art gallery in Cheltenham, Melbourne, Australia, owned and run by art collector Hank Ebes. Founded in 1990, it was one of the first galleries in Melbourne to be devoted entirely to Aboriginal art.

History
The Aboriginal Gallery of Dreamings (AGOD) first opened in a small gallery space on Bourke Street, Melbourne.  It was established as one of the first Aboriginal art galleries in Melbourne. The collection was originally made up of only a couple of hundred paintings from Aboriginal communities Utopia and Alice Springs, belonging to Aboriginal Art collector and gallery founder, Hank Ebes.  The growth of the collection meant that in early 1990 the gallery moved premises to a larger space down the street, where it remained until 2008.

In 2008, AGOD moved to a larger and refurbished location in Cheltenham.  The gallery currently houses more than 3000 paintings.

The Emily Museum
In 2009, more than 200 works by renowned Aboriginal artist Emily Kame Kngwarreye were set aside from the collection at AGOD to form the core for a Melbourne-located museum.  When the gallery owners failed to receive government funding, the Emily Museum was instead opened in early 2013 alongside AGOD, at the gallery space in Cheltenham.  The exhibition showcases the 5x15m "Emily Wall", as well as works from Kngwarreye's Last Series.

Artists
Artists who have work at AGOD include:

 4 Pwerle Sisters
 Pansy Napangardi
 Gloria Petyarre
 Clifford Possum Tjapaltjari
 Timmy Payungka Tjapangati
 Billy Stockman Tjapaltjarri
 Barbara Weir

References

External links
 
 Emily Museum official website

Art museums and galleries in Melbourne
Cheltenham, Victoria
Buildings and structures in the City of Kingston (Victoria)
Museums established in 1990
Australian Aboriginal art
1990 establishments in Australia